Boult is a surname. Notable people with the surname include:

Adrian Boult (1889–1983), English conductor
Swinton Boult (1809–1876), English businessman
Trent Boult (born 1989), New Zealand cricketer